Heteroclinus johnstoni, or Johnston's weedfish, is a species of clinid native to the waters along the around southern Australian coast where it prefers reefs with tall seaweed growth at depths down to about .  This species can reach a maximum length of  TL. The specific name honours the statistician and scientist Robert Mackenzie Johnston (1843-1918).

References

johnstoni
Fish described in 1886
Taxa named by William Saville-Kent